The Mühlviertel is an Austrian region belonging to the state of Upper Austria: it is one of four "quarters" of Upper Austria, the others being Hausruckviertel, Traunviertel, and Innviertel.

Region
The Mühlviertel consists of the four Upper Austrian districts that lie north of the river Danube: Rohrbach, Urfahr-Umgebung, Freistadt and Perg. The parts of the state capital Linz that lie north of the Danube also belong to the Mühlviertel. Geologically it is a part of the Bohemian Massif. Major towns include Rohrbach, Bad Leonfelden, Freistadt and Perg.

History
The region was the site of a notorious war crime at the end of World War II, when hundreds of starving Soviet POWs escaped from nearby Mauthausen concentration camp and were pursued and murdered around Mühlviertel; the SS referred to the event as the Mühlviertler Hasenjagd ("Mühlviertel rabbit hunt"). During the Allied occupation of Austria after World War II, the Mühlviertel belonged to the Soviet occupation zone, while the rest of Upper Austria belonged to the American occupation zone.

See also
Green Hills Fantasy, musical composition describing Mühlviertel

External links 

 

Geography of Upper Austria